Glendale Bungalow was a country house near Bandarawela, Sri Lanka. It is now part of the Bandarawela Central College.

History
At the height of World War II, school children where evacuated from Colombo after it was bombed by the Imperial Japanese Navy in 1942. Many of the prominent schools of Colombo were shifted to the relatively safer Bandarawela town. In 1942 forms 1 - 3 of Royal College, Colombo were moved from its temporary premises in a bungalow on Turret Road, Colombo to the Glendale Bungalow in Bandarawela. Later in 1944, the Royal Preparatory School was also shifted to Glendale. The school functioned as the Bandarawela branch of Royal College, Colombo until 1948, when the sections were moved back to Colombo.

After the departure of Royal College, a new school was established at the vacant premises. In 1954, the prime minister Sir John Kotelawala declared open the college main hall and two storied building and in 1958, it was named as Bandarawela Senior School and after 1972, it became the Bandarwela Madya Maha Vidyalaya (Bandarawela Central College).

See also
Obeyesekere Walawa

References

Royal College, Colombo
Country houses in Sri Lanka
Bandarawela Central College
Houses in Badulla District